The Confederation of African Football (CAF) section of the 2010 FIFA World Cup qualification saw teams compete for five berths in the final tournament in South Africa.  The qualification stage doubled as the qualification stage for the 2010 African Cup of Nations, with fifteen teams qualifying for the finals held in Angola.

In total, 53 nations participated; however, due to the presence of the two tournaments' respective hosts, 52 teams were involved in each competition. South Africa qualified automatically as host for the World Cup, and Angola qualified as host for the African Cup of Nations.  Both nevertheless competed in the qualifying phase to attempt to qualify for the other tournament.

This was the first time since 1934 that the hosts would compete in World Cup qualifiers.  Angola's situation mirrored that of Egypt in the 2006 World Cup qualifiers in Africa, which doubled as the qualifiers to the 2006 African Cup of Nations hosted by Egypt.

First round

Five knockout ties were originally required, involving the ten lowest ranked African countries (based on FIFA rankings as of July 2007). The actual draw was apparently conducted one day before the format was announced by CAF. The pairings were:

 v 
 v 
 v 
 v 
 v 

São Tomé and Príncipe and the Central African Republic both withdrew in early September. As a result, Swaziland and Seychelles (the highest ranked of the ten nations) were no longer required to play in this round, and the teams they were originally matched against, Somalia and Djibouti, were redrawn to play each other instead. The tie between Djibouti and Somalia was played as a one leg tie in Djibouti, as Somalia was not deemed suitable for FIFA matches; the other two ties were played as two leg ties.

|}

Second round

The 48 qualifiers (45 direct entrants plus 3 winners of the first round) were split into 12 groups of 4 in the draw held in Durban, South Africa on 25 November 2007. Teams in each group played a home-and-away round-robin in 2008, with the 12 groups winners and 8 best runners-up advancing to the third round. As not all groups were of equal size after the exclusion of Ethiopia and the withdrawal of Eritrea, when ranking the runners-up, their results against their group's 4th placed team would not be counted.

Seeding
One team from each of the following pots were drawn into each group.

Group 1

Group 2

Group 3

Note: Angola were automatically qualified as hosts of the 2010 African Cup of Nations. However, they were subject to the same rules as other nations for continuation to the next stage of the qualifiers. Failure to advance from this group eliminated them from the qualifiers for the 2010 FIFA World Cup.

Group 4

Note: South Africa were automatically qualified as hosts of the 2010 FIFA World Cup. However, they were subject to the same rules as other nations for continuation to the next stage of the qualifiers. Failure to advance from this group eliminated them from the qualifiers for the 2010 African Cup of Nations.

Group 5

Group 6

Group 7

On 19 March 2007, FIFA announced the immediate suspension of the Malagasy Football Federation (FMF). The suspension was lifted on 19 May 2008.

Group 8

Ethiopia played four matches in this group, before FIFA announced the immediate suspension of the Ethiopian Football Federation (EFF) on 29 July 2008.
On 12 September 2008, FIFA excluded the EFF from the 2010 World Cup qualifiers and the results of their matches were cancelled. While it was not clear if they were also explicitly excluded from the 2010 African Cup of Nations, their failure to complete the remaining fixtures effectively eliminated them from the tournament.

Group 9

Group 10

On 28 March 2008, FIFA announced the immediate suspension of the Chadian Football Federation. The suspension was lifted on 7 May 2008.

Chad was disqualified from the 2010 African Nations Cup qualifiers after failing to show up for their away match against Sudan, despite security guarantees. The match was subsequently rescheduled. Only matches between Mali, Sudan and Congo were taken into account for the qualification of the second round of the preliminaries of the African Cup of Nations. However, Chad was still able qualify for the 2010 FIFA World Cup. This could have led to complications if Chad had advanced to the next round or if Chad's exclusion the now alternate group standings had produced different group winners and impacted on the ranking of the second-placed side.

For African Cup of Nations qualification:

Group 11

Eritrea withdrew from the qualifiers on 25 March 2008 and were not replaced.

Group 12

Rankings of runners-up
Along with the 12 group winners, the 8 highest-ranked runners-up also advanced to the third round. Because not all groups contained an equal number of teams, only results against the first- and third-placed teams in each group counted.

Third round

The 20 remaining sides were split into five groups of four. The draw for the groups took place on 22 October 2008 in Zürich, Switzerland.

The five group winners qualified for the 2010 FIFA World Cup, and were joined by the group runners-up and third-placed teams in qualifying for the 2010 Africa Cup of Nations.

Seeding
Teams were seeded based on their FIFA World Rankings in October 2008 (number in parentheses). One team from each of the following pots was drawn into each group.

Group A

Group B

Group C

Group D

Group E

Qualified teams
The following six teams from CAF qualified for the final tournament.

1 Bold indicates champions for that year. Italic indicates hosts for that year.

Goalscorers
There were 505 goals scored over 202 games, for an average of 2.5 goals per game.

12 goals
 Moumouni Dagano

9 goals
 Samuel Eto'o

8 goals
 Razak Omotoyossi
 Frédéric Kanouté

6 goals
 Didier Drogba
 Dennis Oliech
 Chiukepo Msowoya

5 goals
 Mohamed Aboutrika
 Matthew Amoah
 Ismael Bangoura
 Pascal Feindouno
 Emmanuel Adebayor

4 goals

 Shabani Nonda
 Emad Motaeb
 Amr Zaki
 Roguy Méyé
 Junior Agogo
 Faneva Imà Andriatsima
 Seydou Keita
 Youssef Safri
 Victor Obinna
 Ikechukwu Uche
 Issam Jemâa

3 goals

 Rafik Saifi
 Antar Yahia
 Karim Ziani
 Flávio
 Yssouf Koné
 Achille Emaná
 Jean Makoun
 Dady
 Lys Mouithys
 Zola Matumona
 Dieumerci Mbokani
 Ahmed Hassan
 Hosni Abd Rabo
 Prince Tagoe
 Sekou Cissé
 Bakari Koné
 Boubacar Sanogo
 Esau Kanyenda
 Wilko Risser
 Jerson Tegete
 Adekamni Olufade

2 goals

 Rafik Djebbour
 Abdelkader Ghezzal
 Mohamed Aoudou
 Séïdath Tchomogo
 Diphetogo Selolwane
 Aristide Bance
 Mahamoudou Kéré
 Henri Mbazumutima
 Claude Nahimana
 Albert Meyong
 Syriakata Hassan
 Hilaire Kedigui
 Wilfried Endzanga
 Ahmed Eid
 Daniel Cousin
 Bruno Ecuele Manga
 Fabrice Do Marcolino
 Bruno Zita Mbanangoyé
 Njogu Demba-Nyrén
 Mustapha Jarju
 Laryea Kingston
 Sulley Muntari
 Mamadou Bah
 Kamil Zayatte
 Gervinho
 Salomon Kalou
 Romaric
 Yaya Touré
 McDonald Mariga
 Olivier Makor
 Dioh Williams
 Ahmed Saad
 Lalaina Nomenjanahary
 Rija Rakotomandimby
 Moses Chavula
 Robert Ng'ambi
 Sidi Yaya Keita
 Wesley Marquette
 Youssouf Hadji
 Adel Taarabt
 Domingues
 Miró
 Dário
 Tico-Tico
 Rudolph Bester
 Alhassane Issoufou
 Obafemi Martins
 Peter Odemwingie
 Yakubu
 Joseph Yobo
 Labama Bokota
 Olivier Karekezi
 Saïd Makasi
 El Hadji Diouf
 Philip Zialor
 Kewullay Conteh
 Kagisho Dikgacoi
 Faisal Agab
 Muhannad El Tahir
 Haytham Tambal
 Danny Mrwanda
 Moustapha Salifou
 Oussama Darragi
 Hichem Essifi
 Chaouki Ben Saada
 Geofrey Massa
 Eugene Ssepuuya
 Gilbert Mushangazhike

1 goal

 Nadir Belhadj
 Madjid Bougherra
 Karim Matmour
 Gilberto
 Locó
 Mantorras
 António Mendonça
 Job
 Yamba Asha
 Zé Kalanga
 Khaled Adénon
 Jocelyn Ahoueya
 Romuald Boco
 Stéphane Sessègnon
 Oumar Tchomogo
 Boitumelo Mafoko
 Habib Bamogo
 Charles Kaboré
 Issouf Ouattara
 Jonathan Pitroipa
 Alain Traoré
 Selemani Ndikumana
 André Bikey
 Gustave Bebbe
 Geremi
 Rigobert Song
 Somen Tchoyi
 Pierre Webó
 Babanco
 Lito
 José Semedo
 Marco Soares
 Léger Djimrangar
 Marius Mbaiam
 Misdongarde Betolngar
 Ibor Bakar
 Daoud Midtadi
 Gervais Batota
 Franchel Ibara
 Hérita Ilunga
 Lomana LuaLua
 Trésor Mputu
 Tsholola Tshinyama
 Ahmed Daher
 Yassin Hussein
 Moussa Hirir
 Rodolfo Bodipo
 Juan Ramón Epitié
 Juvenal
 Ronan
 Pierre-Emerick Aubameyang
 Moïse Brou Apanga
 Éric Mouloungui
 Stéphane N'Guéma
 Ousman Jallow
 Aziz Corr Nyang
 Anthony Annan
 Stephen Appiah
 Kwadwo Asamoah
 Michael Essien
 Sambégou Bangoura
 Oumar Kalabane
 Kanga Akalé
 Kader Keïta
 Siaka Tiéné
 Didier Zokora
 Mohammed Jamal
 Austin Makacha
 Francis Ouma
 Julius Owino
 Allan Wanga
 Sello Muso
 Lehlohonolo Seema
 Omar Daoud
 Younes Shibani
 Hesham Shaban
 Osama Al Fazzani
 Guy Hubert Mamihasindrahona
 Praxis Rabemananjara
 Hubert Robson
 Jean Tsaralaza
 Elvis Kafoteka
 Joseph Kamwendo
 Jacob Ngwira
 Atusaye Nyondo
 Noel Mkandawire
 Adama Coulibaly
 Soumaila Coulibaly
 Mamadou Diallo
 Lassane Fané
 Modibo Maïga
 Tenema N'Diaye
 Mamadou Samassa
 Andy Sophie
 Dominique Da Silva
 Ahmed Teguedi
 Abdessalam Benjelloun
 Mounir El Hamdaoui
 Houssine Kharja
 Tarik Sektioui
 Nabil El Zhar
 Merouane Zemmama
 Carlitos
 Genito
 Costa Khaiseb
 Paulus Shipanga
 Ismaël Alassane
 Kamilou Daouda
 Malam Moussa
 Michael Eneramo
 Obinna Nwaneri
 Christian Obodo
 Chidi Odiah
 Bobo Bola
 Patrick Mafisango
 Henri Camara
 Issiar Dia
 Ibrahima Faye
 Cheikh Gueye
 Kader Mangane
 Ibrahima Sonko
 Modou Sougou
 Don Annacoura
 Bernard St. Agne
 Mohamed Kallon
 Sheriff Suma
 Thembinkosi Fanteni
 Surprise Moriri
 Siphiwe Tshabalala
 Ahmed Aadil
 Saif Eldin Ali Idris Farah
 Hassan Korongo
 Mudather El Tahir
 Ala'a Eldin Yousif
 Siza Dlamini
 Collen Salelwako
 Athuman Idd
 Nizar Khalfan
 Khalfan Ngassa
 Kigi Makasi
 Floyd Ayité
 Tijani Belaïd
 Saber Ben Frej
 Radhi Jaïdi
 Ammar Jemal
 Fahid Ben Khalfallah
 Yassin Mikari
 Nabil Taïder
 Wissem Ben Yahia
 Andrew Mwesigwa
 David Obua
 Ibrahim Sekagya
 Dan Wagaluka
 Rainford Kalaba
 Francis Kasonde
 Christopher Katongo
 Felix Katongo
 Cuthbert Malajila
 Esrom Nyandoro

1 own goal

 Saïdou Panandétiguiri (for Ivory Coast)
 Mamadou Tall (for Ivory Coast)
 Said Riyad (for Egypt)
 Bruno Ecuele Manga (for Libya)
 Amin Erbati (for Gabon)
 Pascal Anicet (for Benin)
 Kassaly Daouda (for Angola)
 Joseph Yobo (for Sierra Leone)
 Cheikh Gueye (for Algeria)

References

External links
African zone at FIFA.com

 
CAF
FIFA World Cup qualification (CAF)
Africa Cup of Nations qualification
Qualification (Caf), 2010